
Jinjiang may refer to the following locations in China:

 Jinjiang District (锦江区), Chengdu, Sichuan
 Jinjiang, Fujian (晋江市)

Shanghai 
 Jinjiang Action Park (锦江乐园)
 Jinjiang Park Station (锦江乐园站), on Shanghai Metro Line 1
 Jinjiang Hotel
 Jin Jiang Tower (新锦江大酒店)

Towns 
Written as "金江镇":

 Jinjiang, Hainan, in Chengmai County
 Jinjiang Town, Linwu County in Linwu County, Hunan
 Jinjiang, Panzhihua, in Renhe District, Panzhihua, Sichuan
 Jinjiang, Yunnan, in Shangri-La County

Written as "锦江镇":

 , Pengshan District, Meishan, Sichuan
 Jinjiang, Shanggao County, Jiangxi
 Jinjiang, Yujiang County in Yujiang County, Jiangxi

Townships 
 Jinjiang, Shaoyang (金江乡), a township of Shaoyang County, Hunan province.
 Jinjiang Township, Jiangxi (金江乡), in Jiajiang County

Companies 
 Jinjiang International

See also 
 Jiang Jin
 Jin River (disambiguation)